A list of films produced in Argentina in 1952:

External links and references
 Argentine films of 1952 at the Internet Movie Database

1952
Argentine
Films